Abul is an Arabic masculine given name. It may refer to:

 Abul Kalam Azad
 Abul A'la Maududi
 Abul Khair (disambiguation), several people
 Abul Abbas (disambiguation), several people
 Abul Hasan
 Abul Hasan Ali Hasani Nadwi
 Abu'l-Fazl ibn Mubarak
 Abul Hasan Qutb Shah
 Abul-Hasan Al-Muhajir
 Khidr
 Abul Farah Faridi, Bangladeshi academic
 Abul Kalam (disambiguation), several people
 Abul Kalam Azad, a photographer
 Abul Hossain
 Mufti Abul Qasim Nomani
 Abul Maal Abdul Muhith
 Aurangzeb
 Abul K. Abbas

See also
 Abul Kalam Mohammad (disambiguation), a compound given name
 Abul Aish, a village in Bahrain
 Avul Pakir Jainulabdeen Abdul Kalam (1931 – 2015), 11th President of India
 Abu (disambiguation)
 Abdul
 Apu (disambiguation)

Arabic masculine given names